Boa constrictor is a large South American constricting snake.

Boa constrictor may also refer to:

 "Boa Constrictor" (song), a song by Shel Silverstein from his 1962 album Inside Folk Songs
 "Boa Constrictor", a cover version of Silverstein's song by Johnny Cash on his 1966 album Everybody Loves a Nut
 "Boa Constrictor", a song by The Magnetic Fields from their 1999 album 69 Love Songs
 Earl "Snakehips" Tucker (1905–1937), the "Human Boa Constrictor," creator of the Snakehips dance in the early 1930s
 "Boa Constrictor", a novel by Ivan Yakovych Franko
 Boa knot, a binding knot invented by Peter Collingwood in 1996